Reductoonops is a genus of spiders in the family Oonopidae. It was first described in 2014 by Platnick & Berniker. , it contains 34 species.

Species
Reductoonops comprises the following species:
Reductoonops almirante Platnick & Berniker, 2014
Reductoonops armeria Platnick & Berniker, 2014
Reductoonops bayano Platnick & Berniker, 2014
Reductoonops carpish Platnick & Berniker, 2014
Reductoonops celica Platnick & Berniker, 2014
Reductoonops chamela Platnick & Berniker, 2014
Reductoonops diamant Platnick & Berniker, 2014
Reductoonops domingo Platnick & Berniker, 2014
Reductoonops elqui Platnick & Berniker, 2014
Reductoonops escopeta Platnick & Berniker, 2014
Reductoonops ferry Platnick & Berniker, 2014
Reductoonops hato Platnick & Berniker, 2014
Reductoonops hedlite Platnick & Berniker, 2014
Reductoonops jabin Platnick & Berniker, 2014
Reductoonops jatun Platnick & Berniker, 2014
Reductoonops leticia Platnick & Berniker, 2014
Reductoonops lucha Platnick & Berniker, 2014
Reductoonops marta Platnick & Berniker, 2014
Reductoonops meta Platnick & Berniker, 2014
Reductoonops molleturo Platnick & Berniker, 2014
Reductoonops monte Platnick & Berniker, 2014
Reductoonops naci Platnick & Berniker, 2014
Reductoonops napo Platnick & Berniker, 2014
Reductoonops niltepec Platnick & Berniker, 2014
Reductoonops nubes Platnick & Berniker, 2014
Reductoonops otonga Platnick & Berniker, 2014
Reductoonops palenque Platnick & Berniker, 2014
Reductoonops pichincha Platnick & Berniker, 2014
Reductoonops pinta Platnick & Berniker, 2014
Reductoonops real Platnick & Berniker, 2014
Reductoonops sasaima Platnick & Berniker, 2014
Reductoonops tandapi Platnick & Berniker, 2014
Reductoonops tina Platnick & Berniker, 2014
Reductoonops yasuni Platnick & Berniker, 2014

References

Oonopidae
Araneomorphae genera
Spiders of Mexico
Spiders of Central America
Spiders of South America